Sanchai and Sonchat Ratiwatana were the defending champions but lost in the quarterfinals to Hsieh Cheng-peng and Yang Tsung-hua.

James Cerretani and Joe Salisbury won the title after defeating Enrique López Pérez and Pedro Martínez 6–7(5–7), 6–3, [10–8] in the final.

Seeds

Draw

References
 Main Draw

Doubles
Bangkok Challenger II - Doubles
 in Thai tennis